Rinchinnyam Amarjargal (Mongolian ; born February 27, 1961) was Prime Minister of Mongolia from July 30, 1999 to July 26, 2000. He is a leading member of the Democratic Party.

Life

Early years and education 
Amarjargal was born in Ulaanbaatar in 1961. He fluently speaks Mongolian, Russian and English.
He attended the Plekhanov Russian University of Economics in Moscow and earned a diploma in financial economy in 1982. From 1981 to 1982, he also attended the Evening University for Marxism–Leninism.

After that, Amarjargal worked at the Central Committee of Mongolian Trade Union. He taught at Military Institute from 1983 to 1990 and at Technical University from 1990 to 1991. He worked as a director of the Economic College of Mongolia from 1991 to 1996. From 1994 to 1995, he studied at the University of Bradford, West Yorkshire, England, and graduated with a Master of Science in Macroeconomic Policy and Planning. During his state visit in England in March 2000, the university granted him an honorary doctorate.

In 2003, Amarjargal was a visiting research fellow at the Institute of Economic Research, Hitotsubashi University in Japan.

Political career 

Amarjargal contributed to the democratic movement in Mongolia from the beginning. He was a founding member of the New Progress-Union and the National Progress-Party. Then he helped to merge those with several other parties to form the National Democratic Party (MNDP, Mongolyin Ündesniy Ardchilsan Nam). As per the latter, he was elected to State Great Khural (the parliament) in 1996.

In April 1998, he became a foreign minister under Tsakhiagiin Elbegdorj. In September of the same year he nearly became a prime minister, according to an agreement between the governing coalition and the President, but he was rejected by the Parliament in a close vote. He then remained as the foreign minister until Elbegdorj's government had to step back in December.

In 1999, Amarjargal became a chairman of MNDP. He was finally designated as the Prime Minister of Mongolia on July 30 of the same year. He stayed in office for almost a year until July 26, 2000, when the democratic parties were beaten at the parliamentary elections. While holding office, he had to abandon his seat at the parliament, because of a Constitutional clause still in force at that time. Also in the year 2000 MNDP and Social Democratic Party merged to form Democratic Party.

In 2004, Amarjargal was elected to the parliament as an independent candidate. In 2008, 2012 was elected to the parliament. In 2016 election Amarjargal gave up his mandate to secure parliamentary a female seat quota for DP.

Amarjargal has voiced his support for the Campaign for the Establishment of a United Nations Parliamentary Assembly, an organisation which campaigns for democratic reformation of the United Nations, and the creation of a more accountable international political system.

Amarjargal Foundation 

In 2001, Amarjargal established Amarjargal Foundation. This is an NGO which promotes a transparent and open society, and carries out studies on social welfare, economy, politics, and law. It also negotiates foreign help and investment. Since 1991 Amarjargal is Chairman of the Board of trustees, of the University of Economics and Finance, one of the leading educational establishments in Mongolia.

References

External links 
 Amarjargal Foundation

1961 births
Living people
People from Ulaanbaatar
Democratic Party (Mongolia) politicians
Prime Ministers of Mongolia
Members of the State Great Khural
Mongolian expatriates in Japan
Mongolian expatriates in the Soviet Union
Mongolian expatriates in the United Kingdom
Alumni of the University of Bradford